The 1973 Nottinghamshire County Council election was held on Thursday, 12 April 1973. The election resulted in the Labour Party winning an overall majority of seats on the council.

The election was the first to take place to the new non-metropolitan county council of Nottinghamshire as defined by the Local Government Act 1972, which had reformed local government in England and Wales. The council acted as a "shadow authority" until 1 April 1974, when it gained control from its predecessor county council, which had been established by the Local Government Act 1888.

Whilst previously the City of Nottingham was an independent county borough and therefore not included within the administrative county of Nottinghamshire or involved in the election of county councillors, the new administrative county included Nottingham for the first time as a non-metropolitan district. Nottingham would subsequently regain independent control over its affairs when it became a unitary authority in 1998.

Results by division
Each electoral division returned either one, two or three county councillors. The candidate elected to the council in each electoral division is shown in the table below. "Unopposed" indicates that the councillor was elected unopposed.

References

1973
1973 English local elections
1970s in Nottinghamshire